Jack Lepiarz (born July 11, 1988) is an American journalist, stage performer, street performer, and social media personality. From 2010 to 2023 he was a radio anchor and producer at WBUR in Boston, Massachusetts.

Early life and education 
Lepiarz was born in Waco, Texas, to John Lepiarz, a circus clown, and Linda Van Blerkom, an anthropology professor at Drew University. He grew up in Madison, New Jersey, attending Madison High School, from which he graduated in 2006. As a child, he would join his father traveling with the Big Apple Circus.  His father would perform with bullwhips and throwing knives, and started teaching Jack around the age of 7. He received a bullwhip for Christmas when he was 17.

Lepiarz described feeling ostracized by his school peers for his circus background: “Growing up in normal school, being the son of a circus parent, I was not the most popular person. They never let me forget that I was from the circus. In 2013, I suddenly noticed that a lot of people were getting into the circus arts. I was like, ‘Where was this six years ago?!’” He graduated in 2010 with a bachelor's degree in journalism from Emerson College. While attending Emerson, he was the news director at WERS Emerson College Radio, "basically living there" for two years, and earned money as a street performer in Faneuil Hall and Harvard Square, using the personas "Jacques Ze Whipper" (sometimes alternately spelled "Whippeur" to emphasize the exaggerated French accent) and "Jack the Whipper" (both a reference to Jack the Ripper).

Radio journalism 
After graduating college, Lepiarz worked as a radio anchor and producer at NPR radio station WBUR, in Boston, Massachusetts, having interned first as a senior.

Stage performance and world records 
For several weekends each fall season, Lepiarz performs at King Richard's Faire, a Renaissance fair in New England, as his persona "Jacques Ze Whipper." He was introduced to the event by his father, who was also a regular performer there when Jack was a child. In 2015, after spending 8 weeks training, he appeared to set the Guinness World Record for "most whip cracks with one hand in 60 seconds," with 260, beating the previous record by 3. However, upon review it was discovered he fell a few counts short. He has since set a new records of 278 and 289 (both in 2016) and 298 (in 2020).

Television and social media 
Lepiarz joined TikTok when a clip of him brandishing a flaming whip at King Richard's Faire went viral on the social media platform. In 2022, the video also caught the attention of producers for America's Got Talent, and Lepiarz auditioned for the television show. After being dismissed by talent judge Simon Cowell before he could perform, he invited Cowell on stage and had Cowell hold a strand of dry spaghetti with his legs, then split the spaghetti with a bullwhip. Lepiarz had planned to perform the trick with Howie Mandel, who turned out to be ill. The shows producers had encouraged Lepiarz to use a different trick, which he practiced all day, until host Terry Crews improvised and suggested on air that Lepiarz perform the original trick with Cowell. He had never performed the trick in front of an audience prior, and admitted feeling "nervous."

As of November 2022, Lepiarz has over 2 million TikTok followers.

Personal life 
Lepiarz is married to a photographer and videographer who also helps him with social media work.

References

External links
 WBUR news anchor Jack Lepiarz signs off. His next act? Performing in the circus full time.

Living people
1988 births

American circus performers
American journalists
American radio news anchors
America's Got Talent contestants
Emerson College alumni
Social media influencers
World record holders